The Canon de 105 court modèle 1935 B was a French howitzer used in World War II. It was designed by the State Arsenal at Bourges to replace the Canon de 105 court modèle 1934 Schneider. Some 610 were originally ordered, although production was terminated in 1939 in favor of anti-tank guns. Only some 232 were in service when the German attacked in May 1940. Captured weapons were used by the German Heer as the 10.5 cm leFH 325(f) and assigned to training and second-line occupation units. During Italy's occupation of southern France, 127 pieces were captured by the Royal Italian Army, which used it under the name Obice da 105/15.

Design

Its most interesting feature was that the wheels, which were pressed steel with either solid rims or pneumatic tires, moved with the trail legs and "toed-in" when the gun was in action to provide more cover for the crew.

Notes

References 
 Bishop, Chris, ed. Encyclopedia of Weapons of World War II. New York, Barnes and Noble, 1998 
 Englemann, Joachim and Scheibert, Horst. Deutsche Artillerie 1934-1945: Eine Dokumentation in Text, Skizzen und Bildern: Ausrüstung, Gliderung, Ausbildung, Führung, Einsatz. Limburg/Lahn, Germany: C. A. Starke, 1974
 Gander, Terry and Chamberlain, Peter. Weapons of the Third Reich: An Encyclopedic Survey of All Small Arms, Artillery and Special Weapons of the German Land Forces 1939-1945. New York: Doubleday, 1979 

World War II weapons of France
105 mm artillery
Military equipment introduced in the 1930s